Jaromar is a masculine given name. It is the Polabian form of the West Slavic name, Jaromir. It may refer to:

People:

Jaromar, also Jaromar of Rügen, is the name of several members of Rügen's princely house:
Jaromar I (1141–1218), Prince of Rügen
Jaromar II (1218–1260), Prince of Rügen
Jaromar III (1249–1285), Prince of Rügen, co-regent
Jaromar (bishop) (1267–1294), Bishop of Cammin

Variations:
 Jaromar (Polabian)
 Jaroměr (Upper Sorbian)
 Jaromir (Polish)
 Jaromír (Slovak, Czech)

See also 
 Slavic names

Masculine given names
Slavic given names